The Ármann men's basketball team, commonly known as Ármann, is the men's basketball department of Ármann multi-sport club and is based in Reykjavík, Iceland. As of the 2020-2021 season the team plays in 2. deild karla.

History
Ármann was one of the founding teams of the first Icelandic basketball league in 1952. In 1968, its star player, Birgir Örn Birgis, won the inaugural Player of the Year award. In 1976, Ármann won its first national championship after beating KR 84-74 in the championship clinching game.

On 1 December 1979, Danny Shouse scored 100 points for Ármann in a 1 .deild karla game against Skallagrímur, setting the Icelandic single game scoring record. In January 1980 he scored 76 points in an overtime loss against Grindavík and in February he broke the 70 point barrier again, scoring 72 points against Þór Akureyri. In 10 games, he scored 648 points for an average of 64.8 points per game. His scoring prowess helped Ármann win Division I and achieve promotion to the Úrvalsdeild. Even though Shouse played in the nations tier 2 league during his first season, he was widely regarded as one of the best players in the country and finished third in the vote for Foreign Player of the Year.

On 6 April 2022, Ármann won the 2. deild karla, after winning all 21 league and playoff games, and was promoted to the 1. deild karla.

European record

Trophies and achievements

Titles
Úrvalsdeild karla: 
 Winners (1): 1976
1. deild karla:
 Winners (1): 1980
2. deild karla:
 Winners (4): 2000, 2006, 2015, 2022
Icelandic Men's Basketball Cup:
 Winners (3): 1965, 1975, 1976

Individual awards

Icelandic Basketball Player of the Year
Jón Sigurðsson - 1976
Úrvalsdeild karla Domestic player of the year
Birgir Örn Birgis - 1968
1. deild karla Domestic All-First team
Steinar Kaldal - 2008

Notable players

Notable coaches
 Birgir Örn Birgis 1976–1977
 Michael Wood 1977–1978
 Bob Starr 1979–1980
 Birgir Mikaelsson 2003–2004
 Pétur Ingvarsson
 Tómas Hermannsson
 Karl Guðlaugsson
 Ólafur Þór Jónsson 2021–present

References

Basketball teams in Iceland
Basketball teams established in 1953
1953 establishments in Iceland